Geoffrey Archer may refer to:
 Geoffrey Archer (writer), English fiction writer
 Geoffrey Archer (colonial administrator) (1882–1964), British colonial administrator
 Jeffrey Archer (born 1940), English author and former politician
 Jofra Archer (born 1995), Barbadian-born English cricketer